The Col de Font-de-Cère is a mountain pass culminating at , located in the Mounts of Cantal, in the department of the same name, and in the region of Auvergne-Rhône-Alpes, France.

Toponymy
Font-de-Cère, said as Fònt de Cera in the Auvergnat dialect, means "sources of the Cère". Indeed, it is here that the Cère rises.

Geography

History
Indeed, it was deemed impassable in winter with snow drifts of three metres of snow preventing any passage during the nine long months of winter. Frequenting the route was dangerous as evidenced by numerous wooden and iron crosses along the road in the memories of people killed by bandits or wolves, or else surprised by the rigours of the winter. Despite being an easier crossing, these features pushed the majority of travellers to take the route of the old Roman road (the ) which crossed the mountains of Cantal. After the breakthrough of the Lioran tunnel, the first tunnel of France and the longest in the world when built, the pass has become more frequented.

With the birth of the ski station of Le Lioran, the col is again popular and, in the early 1950s, the Font-de-Cère buron was built, which was a holiday site of the city of Le Mans for some years.

Activities
A restaurant can be found at the col.

Cycling
The col is crossed by a paved road, known as imperial road, connecting Font d'Alagnon to Font-de-Cère. It is a  climb averaging 4.9%.

The route was used during Stage 5 of the 2016 Tour de France, classified as a Category 3 climb, with Greg Van Avermaet winning the stage.

Walking
The col is an important place of passage for hikers during the summer, as it is located on the GR 4 (linking Royan to Grasse), and the GR 400 (Cantal Mountains route) leading to the Puy Mary.

Winter sports
In winter, the site is part of the ski station of Le Lioran and is frequented by followers of winter sports (skiing, snowshoeing, crosscountry skiing, etc.).

References

Landforms of Cantal
Transport in Auvergne-Rhône-Alpes
Mountain passes of Auvergne-Rhône-Alpes
Mountain passes of the Massif Central